Mulleripicus is a genus of birds in the woodpecker family Picidae. They are found in South and Southeast Asia. The genus forms part of the woodpecker subfamily Picinae and has a sister relationship to the genus Dryocopus whose species are widely distributed in Eurasia and the Americas.

Taxonomy
The genus Mulleripicus was erected by the French naturalist Charles Lucien Bonaparte to accommodate the great slaty woodpecker (Mulleripicus pulverulentus). The genus name honours the German naturalist Salomon Müller, The genus belongs to the tribe Picini and is a member of a clade that contains the five genera: Colaptes, Piculus, Mulleripicus, Dryocopus and Celeus.

The genus contains four species.

References

 
Bird genera
 
Taxa named by Charles Lucien Bonaparte
Taxonomy articles created by Polbot